The 2022 DTB Pokal Team Challenge and Mixed Cup was an artistic gymnastics competition.  It featured a Team Challenge that had five-person teams representing their country in separate men's and women's junior and senior divisions and a Mixed Cup featuring teams composed of three men and three women.

Participants 
The Mixed Cup featured teams from four nations: host nation Germany, Italy, Canada, and the United States.  The Team Competition had twelve senior MAG teams, nine senior WAG teams, eleven junior MAG teams, and eight junior WAG teams compete.

Medalists

Senior

Junior

Women's results

Team

Vault

Uneven bars

Balance beam

Floor exercise

Mixed Cup results

Qualification

Final

References 

DTB
DTB
International gymnastics competitions hosted by Germany
DTB